Arthur Berry (3 January 1888 – 15 March 1953) was an English amateur footballer who competed in the 1908 and 1912 Summer Olympics.

Family
Arthur Berry's father Edwin 'Ted' Berry (1858-1925), a solicitor by trade, was a founder member of St. Domingo's FC in 1878. A year later the church team became Everton F.C. as they began to attract players from outwith the congregation. Ted Berry played as an outside-right for Everton for three seasons prior to the formation of the Football League in 1888. He later served as chairman and director of Liverpool F.C. from 1904-1909, overseeing the club's promotion back to the top flight and second League Championship title in successive seasons, 1904/05 and 1905/06.

Club career
Berry studied at Denstone College and Wadham College, Oxford. He played for Oxford University A.F.C., and earned two Blues in 1907 and 1908.

He also played for Liverpool, Fulham, Everton, Wrexham, Northern Nomads and Oxford City. He played for England's amateur team in 24 matches between 1908 and 1913.

Berry ended his playing career in October 1914 when he became a barrister.

International career
Berry earned 25 caps for England amateurs between 1908 and 1913, being one of the team's most used players. He netted 10 goals, including a poker against Sweden in a 6–1 win on 8 September 1908. He was part of the Great Britain's squads which won gold at the 1908 Summer Olympics and 1912 Summer Olympics. In the 1908 tournament, he played alongside Kenneth Hunt, who had been his teammate in the 1907 Varsity football match, and even netted a goal in a 12–1 trashing of Sweden in the first round. He also appeared in the final against Denmark, helping his side with a 2-0 win. In the 1912 tournament, Berry again appeared in the final against the same opponents, this time scoring a goal as Great Britain won 4–2. Berry scored his last goals for the amateur side on 27 February 1913, netting twice in a 4–0 win over France. With 10 goals to his name, Berry is among the top scorers of the England amateur side.

International goals
England Amateurs score listed first, score column indicates score after each Berry goal.

References

External links
profile
LFC profile
Arthur Berry - Oxford University Association Football Club profile

1888 births
1953 deaths
English footballers
English Olympic medallists
England international footballers
Footballers from Liverpool
England amateur international footballers
Liverpool F.C. chairmen and investors
Liverpool F.C. players
Everton F.C. players
Fulham F.C. players
Wrexham A.F.C. players
People educated at Denstone College
Oxford University A.F.C. players
Oxford City F.C. players
Footballers at the 1908 Summer Olympics
Footballers at the 1912 Summer Olympics
Olympic footballers of Great Britain
Olympic gold medallists for Great Britain
Alumni of Wadham College, Oxford
Olympic medalists in football
Medalists at the 1912 Summer Olympics
Medalists at the 1908 Summer Olympics
Association football forwards